Elections to Limavady Borough Council were held on 5 May 2005 on the same day as the other Northern Irish local government elections. The election used three district electoral areas to elect a total of 15 councillors.

Election results

Note: "Votes" are the first preference votes.

Districts summary

|- class="unsortable" align="centre"
!rowspan=2 align="left"|Ward
! % 
!Cllrs
! % 
!Cllrs
! %
!Cllrs
! %
!Cllrs
! % 
!Cllrs
!rowspan=2|TotalCllrs
|- class="unsortable" align="center"
!colspan=2 bgcolor="" | Sinn Féin
!colspan=2 bgcolor="" | DUP
!colspan=2 bgcolor="" | SDLP
!colspan=2 bgcolor="" | UUP
!colspan=2 bgcolor="white"| Others
|-
|align="left"|Bellarena
|25.3
|2
|bgcolor="#D46A4C"|30.0
|bgcolor="#D46A4C"|1
|29.6
|1
|15.1
|1
|0.0
|0
|5
|-
|align="left"|Benbradagh
|bgcolor="#008800"|49.8
|bgcolor="#008800"|3
|0.0
|0
|20.1
|1
|0.0
|0
|30.1
|1
|5
|-
|align="left"|Limavady Town
|17.6
|1
|bgcolor="#D46A4C"|44.1
|bgcolor="#D46A4C"|2
|18.1
|1
|20.2
|1
|0.0
|0
|5
|-
|- class="unsortable" class="sortbottom" style="background:#C9C9C9"
|align="left"| Total
|31.3
|6
|23.9
|3
|23.2
|3
|11.5
|2
|10.1
|1
|15
|-
|}

District results

Bellarena

2001: 2 x SDLP, 1 x DUP, 1 x UUP, 1 x Sinn Féin
2005: 2 x Sinn Féin, 1 x DUP, 1 x SDLP, 1 x UUP
2001-2005 Change: Sinn Féin gain from SDLP

Benbradagh

2001: 3 x Sinn Féin, 1 x United Unionist, 1 x SDLP
2005: 3 x Sinn Féin, 1 x United Unionist, 1 x SDLP
2001-2005 Change: No change

Limavady Town

2001: 2 x UUP, 1 x DUP, 1 x SDLP, 1 x Independent
2005: 2 x DUP, 1 x UUP, 1 x Sinn Féin, 1 x SDLP
2001-2005 Change: DUP and Sinn Féin gain from UUP and Independent

References

Limavady Borough Council elections
Limavady